Miss Polonia 2000 was the 26th Miss Polonia pageant, held on October 14, 2000. The winner was Justyna Bergmann of Kuyavia-Pomerania and she represented Poland in Miss World 2000. 1st Runner-Up Malgorzata Rozniecka represented Poland at Miss International 2001. 2nd Runner-Up Monika Gruda represented the country at Miss Universe 2001.

Final results

Special Awards

Official Delegates

Notes

Did not compete
 Holy Cross
 Lower Poland
 Lower Silesia
 Lubusz
 Opole
 Upper Poland
 Polish Community in Argentina
 Polish Community in Australia
 Polish Community in Belarus
 Polish Community in Brazil
 Polish Community in Canada
 Polish Community in France
 Polish Community in Germany
 Polish Community in Ireland
 Polish Community in Israel
 Polish Community in Lithuania
 Polish Community in Russia
 Polish Community in South Africa
 Polish Community in Sweden
 Polish Community in the U.K.
 Polish Community in the U.S.
 Polish Community in Venezuela

References

External links
Official Website

2000
2000 beauty pageants
2000 in Poland